Peshmerga Hawler Sport Club), is an Iraqi football team based in Erbil, that plays in Iraq Division Two and Kurdistan Premier League.

Managerial history
  Sameer Babo

Honours

Domestic
Kurdistan Premier League
Winners (2): 2016–17, 2018–19

References

External links
 Iraq Clubs- Foundation Dates

2004 establishments in Iraq
Association football clubs established in 2004
Football clubs in Erbil